This is a list of endangered flora of the Mallee region, a biogeographic region in southern Western Australia. It includes all taxa that occur in the region, and have been classified as "R: Declared Rare Flora - Extant Taxa" under the Department of Environment and Conservation's Declared Rare and Priority Flora List, and are hence gazetted as endangered extant flora under the Wildlife Conservation Act 1950.

There are no taxa classified as "X: Declared Rare Flora - Presumed Extinct Taxa" for the region.

There are 50 endangered taxa:
 Acacia auratiflora
 Acacia caesariata
 Acacia depressa
 Acacia lanuginophylla
 Acacia leptalea
 Acacia trulliformis
 Adenanthos eyrei (Toolinna Adenanthos)
 Adenanthos pungens subsp. pungens
 Allocasuarina tortiramula (Twisted Sheoak)
 Anigozanthos bicolor subsp. minor
 Banksia sphaerocarpa var. dolichostyla (Ironcap Banksia)
 Boronia capitata subsp. capitata
 Boronia revoluta (Ironcaps Boronia)
 Caladenia bryceana subsp. bryceana
 Caladenia drakeoides
 Caladenia graniticola
 Caladenia melanema
 Calectasia pignattiana
 Conostylis lepidospermoides (Sedge Conostylis)
 Conostylis rogeri
 Drummondita longifolia
 Dryandra pseudoplumosa
 Eremophila lactea
 Eremophila nivea (Silky Eremophila)
 Eremophila verticillata (Whorled Eremophila)
 Eucalyptus merrickiae (Goblet Mallee)
 Eucalyptus steedmanii (Steedman's Gum)
 Goodenia integerrima
 Grevillea involucrata (Lake Varley Grevillea)
 Grevillea scapigera
 Hibbertia priceana
 Lechenaultia laricina (Scarlet Leschenaultia)
 Muehlenbeckia horrida subsp. abdita
 Myoporum cordifolium
 Myoporum turbinatum (Salt Myoporum)
 Orthrosanthus muelleri
 Ptilotus fasciculatus
 Rhizanthella gardneri (Underground Orchid)
 Ricinocarpos trichophorus
 Roycea pycnophylloides (Saltmat)
 Sphenotoma drummondii (Mountain Paper-heath)
 Stachystemon vinosus
 Symonanthus bancroftii
 Tetratheca aphylla (Bungalbin Tetratheca)
 Thelymitra psammophila (Sandplain Sun Orchid)
 Thelymitra stellata (Star Sun Orchid)
 Tribonanthes purpurea (Granite Pink)
 Verticordia crebra
 Verticordia staminosa var. cylindracea
 Verticordia staminosa var. erecta

References

Further reading
 

 Rare flora of the Mallee region
Endemic flora of Australia
Flora, Mallee
 Mallee
 Endangered, Mallee
Lists of plants of Australia
Lists of biota of Western Australia